Squeeze is a 1997 American crime film written and directed by Robert Patton-Spruill and starring Tyrone D. Burton, Eddie Cutanda, Phuong Duong, Geoffrey Rhue, Russell G. Jones and Leigh Williams. It was released on June 6, 1997, by Miramax Films.

Having chosen jobs at a gas station over school, 14-year-old friends Tyson (Tyrone Burton), Hector (Eddie Cutanda) and Bao (Phuong Duong) are getting pushed around by some of the older boys in their Boston neighborhood. Despite the stability provided by their relationship with youth club worker J.J. (Geoffrey Rhue), the boys are tempted by the fast money of the drug trade and touched by untimely death. Amid the flurry of mixed messages, the boys must decide which paths to follow.

Cast    
Tyrone D. Burton as Tyson
Eddie Cutanda as Hector
Phuong Duong as Bao 
Geoffrey Rhue as JJ
Russell G. Jones as Tommy
Leigh Williams as Marcus
Robert Agredo as Uzi 
Beresford Bennett as Derick
Jennifer Maxcy as Lisa
Harlem Logan as Fiend
Diane Beckett as Aunt C 
Ingrid Askew as Pearl
James Spruill as Psychiatrist / Homelessman
William K. Butler as Jason 
Daryl Bugg as Mason
Maleah Liggins as Tisha
Pinky Lugo as Pinky
Milagros Jones as Angela
Jessica Edwards as Marrisa
Victor Nunez as Julio

References

External links
 

1997 films
American crime films
1997 crime films
Films set in Boston
Films shot in Boston
Films directed by Robert Patton-Spruill
1990s English-language films
1990s American films